The philosopher Charles Sanders Peirce (1839–1914) did considerable work over a period of years on the classification of 
sciences (including mathematics). His classifications are of interest both as a map for navigating his philosophy and as an accomplished polymath's survey of research in his time. Peirce himself was well grounded and produced work in many research fields, including logic, mathematics, statistics, philosophy, spectroscopy, gravimetry, geodesy, chemistry, and experimental psychology.

Classifications

Philosophers have done little work on classification of the sciences and mathematics since Peirce's time. Noting Peirce's "important" contribution, Denmark's Birger Hjørland commented: "There is not today (2005), to my knowledge, any organized research program about the classification of the sciences in any discipline or in any country". As Miksa (1998) writes, the "interest for this question largely died in the beginning of the 20th century". It is not clear whether Hjørland includes the classification of mathematics in that characterization.

Taxa

In 1902 and 1903 Peirce elaborates classifications of the sciences in: 
"A Detailed Classification of the Sciences" in Minute Logic (Feb.–Apr. 1902), Collected Papers of Charles Sanders Peirce (CP) v. 1, paragraphs 203–283
July 1902 application to the Carnegie institution (MS L75)
"An Outline Classification of the Sciences (CP 1.180-202) in his "A Syllabus of Certain Topics in Logic" (1903), wherein his classifications of the sciences take more or less their final form

However, only in the "Detailed Classification" and the Carnegie application does he discuss the taxa which he used, which were inspired by the biological taxa of Louis Agassiz.

Sciences

In 1902, he divided science into Theoretical and Practical. Theoretical Science consisted of Science of Discovery and Science of Review, the latter of which he also called "Synthetic Philosophy", a name taken from the title of the vast work, written over many years, by Herbert Spencer. Then, in 1903, he made it a three-way division: Science of Discovery, Science of Review, and Practical Science. In 1903 he characterized Science of Review as:
...arranging the results of discovery, beginning with digests, and going on to endeavor to form a philosophy of science. Such is the nature of Humboldt's Cosmos, of Comte's Philosophie positive, and of Spencer's Synthetic Philosophy. The classification of the sciences belongs to this department.

Peirce had already for a while divided the Sciences of Discovery into:
(1) Mathematics – draws necessary conclusions about hypothetical objects
(2) Cenoscopy – philosophy about positive phenomena in general, such as confront a person at every waking moment, rather than special classes, and not settling theoretical issues by special experiences or experiments
(3) Idioscopy – the special sciences, about special classes of positive phenomena, and settling theoretical issues by special experiences or experiments
Thus Peirce ends up framing two fields each of which is philosophy in a sense: cenoscopic philosophy which precedes the special sciences, and synthetic philosophy (that is to say, science of review), which does take advantage of the results of all the sciences of discovery and develops, for instance, classifications of the sciences.

Peirce opens his 1903 classification (the "Syllabus" classification) with a concise statement of method and purpose:
This classification, which aims to base itself on the principal affinities of the objects classified, is concerned not with all possible sciences, nor with so many branches of knowledge, but with sciences in their present condition, as so many businesses of groups of living men. It borrows its idea from Comte's classification; namely, the idea that one science depends upon another for fundamental principles, but does not furnish such principles to that other. It turns out that in most cases the divisions are trichotomic; the First of the three members relating to universal elements or laws, the Second arranging classes of forms and seeking to bring them under universal laws, the Third going into the utmost detail, describing individual phenomena and endeavoring to explain them. But not all the divisions are of this character....

The following table is based mostly on Peirce's 1903 classification, which was more or less the final form. But see after the table for discussion of his later remarks on the divisions of logic.

Logic's divisions later

In a piece which the Collected Papers editors called "Phaneroscopy" and dated as 1906, Peirce wrote (CP 4.9):

Thus the three main 1903 departments of logic were now sub-departments of the study of the logic of symbols.

In a letter to J. H. Kehler, printed in The New Elements of Mathematics v.3, p. 207 and dated 1911, Peirce wrote:

There in 1911 Peirce does not mention the 1906 division into logics of icons, indices and symbols. Critic and Methodeutic appear, as in 1902 and 1903, as the second and third main departments of logic. Analytic is now the first department and the word "Stechiology" goes unused. He includes in Analytic the consideration of issues which, back in his 1902 Carnegie Institute application, he had discussed in sections on logic with headings such as "Presuppositions of Logic" and "On the Logical Conception of Mind" that he had placed before the sections on logic's departments (stechiology, critic, and methodeutic).

In that same Carnegie Institute application as in many other places, Peirce treated belief and doubt as issues of philosophical logic apart from psychology.

Notes

References

Peirce, C.S., 1902, "An Outline Classification of the Sciences", The Collected Papers, vol. 1, pp. 203–283 (1902) Eprint, from projected book Minute Logic.
Peirce, C.S., 1902, "On the Classification of the Theoretic Sciences of Research", Manuscript L75.350-357, Arisbe Eprint, from "Logic, Considered As Semeiotic", Manuscript L75, with draft sections labeled and interpolated into the final (submitted July 1902) version of the 1902 Carnegie Institute application, Joseph Ransdell, ed., Arisbe Eprint.
Peirce, C.S., 1903, "A Detailed Classification of the Sciences", The Collected Papers, vol. 1, pp. 180–202 (1903)  Eprint and Eprint, from "A Syllabus Of Certain Topics In Logic", the Essential Peirce, vol. 2, pp. 258–330.
Vehkavaara, Tommi, 2001, "The outline of Peirce's classification of sciences (1902-1911)",  .
Vehkavaara, Tommi, 2003, "Development of Peirce's classification of sciences - three stages: 1889, 1898, 1903",  .

External links
 Arisbe: The Peirce Gateway, Joseph Ransdell, ed.
 The Commens Dictionary of Peirce's Terms, Mats Bergman & Sami Paavola, eds.
 C.S. Peirce’s: Architectonic Philosophy, Albert Atkin, 2004, 2005, the Internet Encyclopedia of Philosophy.
 
 Classification (of the sciences) (once there, scroll down) by Professor A. C. Armstrong, Jr. (Wesleyan University) in the Dictionary of Philosophy and Psychology, James Mark Baldwin, ed., 1901–1905.
 Peirce's first classification of sciences (1889); Peirce's classification of theoretical sciences and arts (1898); Peirce's outline classification of sciences (1903). Compiled by Tommi Vehkavaara, 2003.

Philosophy of science
Charles Sanders Peirce
Scientific classification